The first season of X Factor premiered on 6 March 2011 at 20:00 on TVN. The auditions for this season were held in January and February. Jarosław Kuźniar hosts the show and the judges are Czesław Mozil, Maja Sablewska and Kuba Wojewódzki. The series was won by Gienek Loska who was mentored by Czesław Mozil. The second place was taken by Michał Szpak and the third finalist was Ada Szulc.

Filming of the first season began with the first audition with judges and audience on 24 January in Zabrze. The live shows began on 24 April and the finale was broadcast on 5 June.

Selection process

Auditions 
The first stage of the show were pre-auditions, held in four major cities across Poland. The candidates sang two chosen songs a cappella in the pre-auditions, where they were judged by the show's producers only. The judges didn't take part in pre-auditions and the performances were not filmed for the show at this stage. The candidates who had got through participated in the second stage of the auditions which took place in two cities. At this stage they performed in front of the judges and a live audience. Highlights from these auditions were broadcast on television during the initial programmes of the season.

Viewers could take part in the auditions as members of the audience, by invitation, in Zabrze and Warsaw by sending an SMS.

Bootcamp (10 April)
The second stage took place on 13 and 14 February in Warsaw. During the first day a hundred acts performed one chosen song from a list of twelve prepared by the judges. They performed in small groups depending on the song choice. Each contestant got a part to sing. The most popular songs were: You Can Leave Your Hat On  by Joe Cocker, Apologize by OneRepublic, Cicho by Ewa Farna, Mercy by Duffy, Śniadanie Do Łóżka by Andrzej Piaseczny, A Night Like This by Caro Emerald and Rihanna’s Only Girl (In the World). Then the judges chose forty acts who got through to the second day of bootcamp. Other sixty contestants had to quit the competition and go home. However three solo girls who applied as soloists were offered to stay in the competition and perform as a group. The new girlband called By Mistake was formed. Remaining forty acts spent the night in a hotel in Warsaw. There they had time to prepare their bootcamp challenge. From the list of ten songs they had to choose one and perform in front of the judges next day. The most sung were: Konstelacje by Pin, Bad Romance by Lady Gaga, Sweet About Me by Gabriella Cilmi, Czas nie będzie czekał by Blue Cafe, and Light My Fire by The Doors. Then the judges made a decision again. They chose only fifteen acts, who got through to the judges' houses stage. After announcing the names, the fifteen lucky acts were divided into three categories, five acts in each. They waited in three rooms for their mentors to come. Eventually Czesław Mozil got the Over-25s, Maja Sablewska was given the Groups and Kuba Wojewódzki was asked to look after the 16-24s.

Judges' houses (17 April)
Maja Sablewska was joined by Sebastian Karpiel-Bułecka, who helped her to choose her final three acts. Kuba Wojewódzki invited Alicja Bachleda-Curuś and Czesław Mozil was aided by Monika Brodka.

The six eliminated acts were:
 16-24s: Anna Kłys, Ada Styrcz
 Over-25s: Marta Podulka, Wojciech Strzelecki
 Groups: De Pe, By Mistake

Categories and contestants 
The top 9 contestants was revealed on 17 April 2011.

Key:
 – Winner
 – Runner-up
 – Third Place

Live shows

Results table 

Contestants' colour key:
{|
|-
| – Czesław Mozil's contestants (over 25s)
|-
| – Kuba Wojewódzki's contestants (16–24s)
|-
| – Maja Sablewska's contestants (groups)
|}

Sablewska refused to vote as the second one as two of her acts were in bottom two, so Mozil voted instead of her and then she did not have to choose as after two judges' vote there was already a majority.
Sablewska was not asked to vote as after other judges' vote there was already a majority.

Live show details

Week 1 (24 April)
Theme: The Biggest Hits of All-Time

Judge's vote to save
 Wojewódzki: Sweet Rebels – gave no objective reason; mentioned that he had allergy to avocado
 Mozil: Sweet Rebels – thought that Sweet Rebels' performances 'mean something', unlike Avocado's performances
 Sablewska refused to vote as the second so Mozil voted instead of her and then she did not have to make a choice as after two judges' votes there was already a majority

Week 2 (1 May)
Theme: Songs from films

Judge's vote to save
 Sablewska: Sweet Rebels – backed her own act
 Mozil: William Malcolm – backed his own act
 Wojewódzki: Sweet rebels – gave no reason

Week 3 (8 May)
Theme: Love songs

Judge's vote to save
 Wojewódzki: Mats Meguenni – backed his own act
 Sablewska: Sweet rebels – backed her own act
 Mozil: Mats Meguenni - gave no reason

Week 4 (15 May)
Theme: Big Band
Group performance: "She Bangs"

Judge's vote to save
 Wojewódzki: Mats Meguenni – backed his own act
 Sablewska: Dziewczyny – backed her own act
 Mozil: Dziewczyny – based on final showdown performances

Week 5 (22 May)
Theme: Number-one hits; Polish songs

Judge's vote to save
 Mozil: Małgorzata Stankiewicz – backed his own act
 Sablewska: Dziewczyny – backed her own act
 Wojewódzki: Małgorzata Stankiewicz – stated that he believed Małgorzata Stankiewicz would make the stage bubble

Week 6: Semi-final (29 May)
Theme: Biggest Pop music songs

Judge's vote to save
 Wojewódzki: Michał Szpak – backed his own act
 Mozil: Michał Szpak – based on the final showdown performance
 Sablewska was not asked to vote as after other judges' votes there was already a majority

Week 7: Final (5 June)
Theme: No theme (songs the mentor and contestants believe will get them through the final); celebrity duets
Celebrity duet performers:
Basia Trzetrzelewska with Ada Szulc
Maciej Maleńczuk with Gienek Loska
Alexandra Burke with Michał Szpak
Group performance: "Billionaire" (performed by all top 9 contestants)
Celebrity performers: Alexandra Burke ("Bad Boys")

Ratings

References

External links 
  X Factor website
  
 

1
2011 Polish television seasons
Poland 01